Linx Cargo Care Group is a transportation and logistics company in Australia and New Zealand – headquartered in Sydney.

History
Linx Cargo Care Group was founded in August 2016 when Asciano was broken up in August 2016. The Patrick Bulk and Automotive Port Services business was purchased by a consortium of British Columbia Investment Management Corporation, Brookfield Asset Management, GIC and the Qatar Investment Authority and renamed the Lynx Cargo Care Group.

Business Units
Linx Cargo Care Group comprises Linx, Autocare Services, C3, Pedersen Group, and GeelongPort.

Linx
The Linx business provides road transport and rail services – stevedore services and bulk storage and handling solutions,

Autocare Services
Autocare Services operates a national network of finished vehicle logistics and related services across every Australian state and the Northern Territory. Autocare was founded in 1961 – acquired by Patrick in 1996 and is now part of Linx Cargo Care Group following the completion of the Asciano transaction in August 2016. After a period of administration in 2021, Autocare was restructured.

GeelongPort
GeelongPort, at the Port of Geelong in Victoria, 75 kilometers southwest of Melbourne, is Victoria's second largest port. Privatized in 1996, GeelongPort is owned by SAS Trustee Corporation (STC) and Linx Cargo Care Group, with 50% ownership by each party.

C3
C3 specializes in forestry and logistics in Australia and New Zealand – handling more than 16 million tonnes of cargo annually.  This includes paper products, pulp, steel, wood processed products, and bulk cargo such as fertilizer, general cargo and logs.

Pedersen Group
Linx Cargo Care Group, and its subsidiary C3, announced on 24 July 2018 that it was successful in its bid to acquire Pedersen Group, a market leading provider of wood chipping and wood yard management services to pulp and paper mills, and forest owners in Australia and New Zealand. Pedersen Group handles over 8.3 million tonnes per annum of wood fibre across its operations, in the form of logs, wood chips , and hog fuel. The company employs people across Australia and New Zealand and has an existing joint venture with C3 Limited, which provides wood yard management services to customers. The purchase agreement was finalised in August 2018.

Enfield Intermodal Terminal
On 20 February 2018, NSW Ports announced that Linx Cargo Care Group had been successful in its bid to takeover the Enfield Intermodal Terminal in Western Sydney from Aurizon. Linx Cargo Care Group leases and operates the NSW Ports-owned intermodal terminal located 18 kilometres from Port Botany. Enfield's location is a strategic staging ground for container imports from Port Botany and exports from regional New South Wales.

As of March 2018, Linx was working with NSW Ports and Goodman Group to support the development of a freight hub on the land surrounding the Enfield Intermodal Terminal. On 2 April 2018, Linx commenced operating rail services from Port Botany via the Enfield Intermodal Terminal to Toll Holdings' Carrington terminal after purchasing two G class locomotives and 34 container wagons from Aurizon. These are assisted by hired in Rail First Asset Management traction as required.

In February 2022, Linx were potentially to start operating a service from Bairnsdale to Melbourne via the Gippsland railway line service for Fenning Timbers, with rumours that their two G class would be transferred from Sydney.

References

Brookfield Asset Management
Companies based in Sydney
Freight railway companies of Australia
Logistics companies of Australia
Qatar Investment Authority
Transport companies established in 2016
2016 establishments in Australia